is a Japanese Olympic beach volleyballer. She competed at the 2008 Summer Olympics, and is partnered with Mika Teru Saiki.

External links
 Official blog
 
 
 
 

1975 births
Living people
Japanese beach volleyball players
Japanese women's volleyball players
Women's beach volleyball players
Olympic beach volleyball players of Japan
Asian Games medalists in beach volleyball
Asian Games bronze medalists for Japan
Medalists at the 1998 Asian Games
Medalists at the 2002 Asian Games
Beach volleyball players at the 1998 Asian Games
Beach volleyball players at the 2002 Asian Games
Beach volleyball players at the 2004 Summer Olympics
Beach volleyball players at the 2006 Asian Games
Beach volleyball players at the 2008 Summer Olympics
People from Matsuyama, Ehime